Stephen R. Leopold is a former member of the Wisconsin State Assembly.

Biography
Leopold was born on June 19, 1944, in Jefferson City, Missouri. He graduated from Shorewood High School in Shorewood, Wisconsin, before earning a Bachelor of Arts degree from Stanford University in 1966 and attending graduate school at the University of Wisconsin–Milwaukee. During the Vietnam War, Leopold was a member of the United States Army Special Forces. He achieved the rank of captain before being held as a prisoner of war from 1968 to 1973. Leopold is married with two children.

Political career
Leopold was first elected to the Assembly in 1976. He is a Democrat.

References

1944 births
Living people
People from Jefferson City, Missouri
People from Shorewood, Wisconsin
Democratic Party members of the Wisconsin State Assembly
Military personnel from Wisconsin
Members of the United States Army Special Forces
United States Army officers
United States Army personnel of the Vietnam War
Vietnam War prisoners of war
Stanford University alumni
University of Wisconsin–Milwaukee alumni
Shorewood High School (Wisconsin) alumni